Sid Bass (January 22, 1913 – June 19, 1993) was a songwriter and orchestra leader. He was born in New York City and attended New York University.

After working for Muzak he was hired as a staff composer by RCA. He also recorded a number of albums for RCA, many appearing on their low-budget "Vik" label. One highlight of Bass' work was his orchestration of Gale Garnett's 1964 hit album My Kind of Folk Songs. Working alongside producer Andy Wiswell, Bass' efforts also yielded Gale's top 5 hit "We'll Sing in the Sunshine" (which she also wrote) that same year.

In 1962 Bass also received arranging credits for the first two Four Seasons' hits "Sherry" and "Big Girls Don't Cry" as well as their Christmas LP Seasons Greetings. Bass also conducted and arranged songs of Staff Sergeant Barry Sadler ("The Ballad of the Green Berets").

His orchestra also recorded the "Here Come the Yankees" theme that's still played before each New York Yankee radio broadcast.

1913 births
1993 deaths
American male composers
Songwriters from New York (state)
Musicians from New York City
New York University alumni
20th-century American composers
20th-century American male musicians
American male songwriters